Ask Me Now! is an album by American jazz clarinetist Pee Wee Russell featuring trombonist Marshall Brown recorded in 1963 for the Impulse! label.

Reception
The Allmusic review by Scott Yanow awarded the album 5 stars stating "It is a remarkable and very lyrical date that briefly rejuvenated the career of this veteran individualist".

Track listing
 "Turnaround" (Ornette Coleman) - 4:14 
 "How About Me?" (Irving Berlin) - 4:16 
 "Ask Me Now!" (Thelonious Monk) - 2:30 
 "Some Other Blues" (John Coltrane) - 3:16 
 "I'd Climb the Highest Mountain" (Lew Brown, Sidney Clare) - 3:26 
 "Licorice Stick" (Marshall Brown) - 3:36 
 "Prelude to a Kiss" (Duke Ellington, Irving Gordon, Irving Mills) - 2:41 
 "Baby, You Can Count on Me" (Freddie Stewart) - 5:01 
 "Hackensack" (Monk) - 3:37 
 "Angel Eyes (Earl Brent, Matt Dennis) - 2:51 
 "Calypso Walk" (Marshall Brown) - 2:34 
Recorded in New York City on April 9 & 10, 1963

Personnel
Pee Wee Russell - clarinet
Marshall Brown - valve trombone, bass trumpet
Russell George - double bass
Ronnie Bedford - drums

References

Impulse! Records albums
Pee Wee Russell albums
1965 albums
Instrumental albums